Khoku  is a village development committee in Shahidbhumi Rural Municipality in the Dhankuta District of Province No. 1 in eastern Nepal. At the time of the 1991 Nepal census it had a population of 3892 people living in 699 individual households.

References

Populated places in Dhankuta District